The 1995–96 Slovenian Football Cup was the fifth season of the Slovenian Football Cup, Slovenia's football knockout competition.

Qualified clubs

1994–95 Slovenian PrvaLiga members
Beltinci
Celje
Gorica
Izola
Jadran Dekani
Koper
Kočevje
Korotan Prevalje
Ljubljana
Maribor
Mura
Naklo
Olimpija
Primorje
Rudar Velenje
Vevče

Qualified through MNZ Regional Cups
MNZ Ljubljana:  Zagorje, Črnuče
MNZ Maribor: Železničar Maribor, Pobrežje
MNZ Celje: Šentjur, Dravinja
MNZ Koper: Ilirska Bistrica
MNZ Nova Gorica: Adria
MNZ Murska Sobota: Cankova, Bakovci
MNZ Lendava: Nafta Lendava, Čentiba
MNZG-Kranj: Sava Kranj, Visoko
MNZ Ptuj: Aluminij, Drava Ptuj

First round

|}

Round of 16

|}

Quarter-finals

|}

Semi-finals

|}

Final

First leg

Second leg

Slovenian Football Cup seasons
Cup
Slovenian Cup